John R. Edwards is a United States Air Force Brigadier General who is currently the Director for Strategic Policy on the National Security Council at the White House.  He has served as the director of the Nuclear Enterprise Directorate of the Defense Threat Reduction Agency since June 2020. He previously commanded the 28th Bomb Wing.

Edwards served as the Director of the United States Secretary of the Air Force and Chief of Staff of the United States Air Force Executive Action Group from 2019 to 2020. Earlier, he commanded the 28th Bomb Wing at Ellsworth Air Force Base in Rapid City, South Dakota; the 479th Flying Training Group at Naval Air Station Pensacola, Florida; and the 96th Bomb Squadron at Barksdale Air Force Base, Louisiana.  He has served in several positions on the Joint Chiefs of Staff and the Air Force Air Staff.  He holds graduate degrees from the George Washington University, School of Advanced Air and Space Studies, and Air Command and Staff College.  He was the national defense visiting fellow at the Stimson Center from 2012 to 2013.

References

Living people
Year of birth missing (living people)
Place of birth missing (living people)
United States Air Force generals